Isaac Adongo (born 12 October 1972) is a Ghanaian politician and member of the 8th Ghanaian Parliament representing the Bolgatanga Central Constituency in the Upper East Region on the ticket of the National Democratic Congress. He was first elected in 2016 and he was re-elected in 2020.
He gained international recognition in 2022 for ruthlessly mocking the defender of Manchester United and England Harry Maguire and comparing him to Vice-president of Ghana , Mahamudu Bawumia saying that he is an "Economic Maguire" who scores own goals in the Country's Economy.

Early life and education 
Adongo hails from Bolgatanga. He is a graduate of the Institute of Chartered Accountants and the University of Ghana.

References

Ghanaian MPs 2017–2021
Living people
National Democratic Congress (Ghana) politicians
Ghanaian MPs 2021–2025
1972 births
University of Ghana alumni
Harvard Law School alumni